Jonquière is a federal electoral district in Quebec, Canada, that was represented in the House of Commons of Canada from 1979 to 2004 and again from the 2015 election onward.

This riding was created in 1976 from parts of Lapointe and Montmorency ridings. It was abolished in 2003 when it was redistributed into Jonquière—Alma and Chicoutimi—Le Fjord ridings. It was re-created during the 2012 electoral redistribution from parts of Jonquière—Alma, Chicoutimi—Le Fjord and Roberval—Lac-Saint-Jean.

Members of Parliament
This riding elected the following Members of Parliament}:

Election results

2015–present

1979–2004

See also 

 List of Canadian federal electoral districts
 Past Canadian electoral districts

References

External links 

 Website of the Parliament of Canada
 Riding History from the Parliament of Canada

Quebec federal electoral districts
Politics of Saguenay, Quebec